Prevalje pod Krimom is a settlement in the Municipality of Brezovica in central Slovenia. The municipality is part of the traditional region of Inner Carniola and is now included in the Central Slovenia Statistical Region.

Name
The name of the settlement was changed from Prevalje to Prevalje pod Krimom in 1953.

Church

The local church, built on a small hill called Žalostna gora' (Mount of Sorrows) north of the settlement, is dedicated to Our Lady of Sorrows and was built in 1727 by the Carthusians from Bistra. It belongs to the Parish of Preserje.

References

External links

Prevalje pod Krimom on Geopedia

Populated places in the Municipality of Brezovica